The Assamese Wikipedia is the Assamese language edition of Wikipedia, the free encyclopedia. Its domain came into existence on June 2, 2002. In July 2015, it had reached 3,600 articles.

It now has  articles with  registered users.

The first Assamese Wikipedia workshop was organized in Guwahati University on January 29, 2012, and later another on February 1, 2012, at the Tezpur University in Tezpur to inform people how to edit and add to the wiki. Later on, many other workshops have been organized by community members in different places in Assam.

References

External links

Assamese Wikipedia
Assamese Wikipedia mobile version
Assamese wikipedia statistics
Assamese Wikipedia in Twitter

Wikipedias by language
Internet properties established in 2002
Wikipedia
Assamese-language mass media
2002 establishments in India
Wikipedia in India